Twin Sons of Different Mothers is a collaboration album by American singer-songwriter Dan Fogelberg and jazz flutist Tim Weisberg, released in 1978. It was the first of two collaborations between the pair; the second was No Resemblance Whatsoever. 

The closing track of the album, "The Power of Gold", was released as a single, reaching number 24 on the Billboard Hot 100 and number 51 in Canada.

Track listing
All songs written by Dan Fogelberg, except where noted.

"Twins Theme" – 1:29 (instrumental)
"Intimidation" – 3:27 (instrumental)
"Lazy Susan" – 2:36 (instrumental)
"Guitar Etude No. 3" – 2:53 (instrumental)
"Tell Me to My Face" (Allan Clarke, Tony Hicks, Graham Nash) – 7:15
"Hurtwood Alley" – 2:48 (instrumental)
"Lahaina Luna" – 3:15 (instrumental)
"Paris Nocturne" – 3:34 (instrumental)
"Since You've Asked" (Judy Collins) – 2:41
"The Power of Gold" – 4:34

Personnel 
 Dan Fogelberg – acoustic piano (1, 2, 8, 9, 10), electric guitar (2, 3, 5, 6, 7, 10), percussion (2, 3, 7, 10), acoustic guitar (3, 5, 6, 10), classical guitar (4, 7), bass (3, 6), voices (3), lead vocals (5, 9, 10), ARP synthesizer (5), mandolin (5), slide guitar (5), backing vocals (5), string arrangements 
 Tim Weisberg – flute (1-5, 7-10), piccolo (5, 7), percussion (6), oboe (8)
 Neil Larsen – electric piano (2, 7), acoustic piano (5)
 John Hug – zither (6)
 Willie Weeks – bass (2, 5, 7)
 Norbert Putnam – bass (10)
 Andy Newmark – drums (2, 4-7), Syndrum (7)
 Jim Keltner – drums (3, 10)
 Bobbye Hall – congas (2, 7), cowbell (2), percussion (4)
 Gary Coleman – percussion (9)
 Joe Lala – congas (10)
 David Breinenthal – bassoon (9)
 John Ellis – oboe (9)
 Earl Dumler – English horn (9)
 Vincent DeRosa – French horn (9)
 Ann Stockton – harp (9)
 Glen Spreen – string arrangements 
 Don Henley – harmony vocals (5, 10)
 Florence Warner – backing vocals (10)

Production 
 Dan Fogelberg – producer 
 Tim Weisberg – producer 
 Marty Lewis – engineer, mixing 
 Glenn Meadows – mastering 
 John Kosh – art direction, design 
 Norman Seeff – photography 
 Front Line Management – management 

Studios
 Recorded at Record Plant (Sausalito, California); A&M Studios and Sunset Sound (Hollywood, California); The Village Recorder, Wally Heider Recording Studios and United Studios (Los Angeles, California).
 Mixed at Quadraphonic Sound Studios (Nashville, Tennessee).
 Mastered at Masterfonics (Nashville, Tennessee).

Charts

References

Dan Fogelberg albums
1978 albums
Collaborative albums
Epic Records albums